Betlhem Desalegn Belayneh (Amharic: ቤተልሄም ደሳለኝ በላይነህ; born 13 November 1991 in Addis Ababa) is an Ethiopian-born Emirati middle-distance runner. At the 2012 Summer Olympics, she competed in the Women's 1500 metres.

In 2017, Betlhem was banned for two years for the irregularities in her biological passport. In addition to the ban, all of her results between 6 March 2014 and 22 July 2016 were voided.

Competition record

Personal bests
Outdoor
 400 metres – 58.07 (Manama 2013)
 800 metres – 2:06.81 (Sollentuna 2013) NR
 1500 metres – 4:05.13 (Doha 2013)
 3000 metres – 8:53.75 (Stockholm 2015)
 5000 metres – 15:12.84 (Pune 2013)
 3000 metres steeplechase – 9:53.19 (Stockholm 2014)
Indoor
 1500 metres – 4:05.61 (Stockholm 2015)
 3000 metres – 8:44.59 (Doha 2016)

References

Living people
1991 births
Emirati female middle-distance runners
Emirati steeplechase runners
Ethiopian female steeplechase runners
Ethiopian female middle-distance runners
Olympic athletes of the United Arab Emirates
Athletes (track and field) at the 2012 Summer Olympics
Asian Games competitors for the United Arab Emirates
Athletes (track and field) at the 2010 Asian Games
Athletes (track and field) at the 2014 Asian Games
World Athletics Championships athletes for the United Arab Emirates
Doping cases in athletics
Islamic Solidarity Games medalists in athletics